Michael Gempart (born 21 April 1941 in Winterthur) is a Swiss actor.

Selected filmography
 The Boat Is Full (1981)
 Tour de Ruhr (1981, TV miniseries)
 Kassettenliebe (1982)
 Chouans! (1988)

References

External links

1941 births
Living people
People from Winterthur
Swiss male film actors